Wallarobba railway station is located on the North Coast line in New South Wales, Australia opening on 4 August 1911. It serves the rural locality of the same name. Originally a full-length platform with wooden station buildings it was later replaced by the present short platform. It is serviced by NSW TrainLink Hunter line services travelling between Newcastle and Dungog.

Platforms & services
Wallarobba consists of a single wooden platform about three metres long. It is serviced by NSW TrainLink Hunter line services travelling between Newcastle and Dungog. There are five services in each direction on weekdays, with three on weekends and public holidays. It is a request stop with passengers required to notify the guard if they wish to alight.

Accessibility
Although classified as wheelchair accessible, there have been complaints that the ramp is too steep and can not be used by wheelchairs. However, this was fixed in 2014 when the station received an upgrade.

References

External links
Wallarobba station details Transport for New South Wales

Easy Access railway stations in New South Wales
Railway stations in the Hunter Region
Railway stations in Australia opened in 1911
Regional railway stations in New South Wales
Short-platform railway stations in New South Wales, 1 car or less